Patkul may refer to:

 Johann Patkul, Livonian politician and agitator of Baltic German extraction
 German exonym for Patkule, a village in Latvia